WCRF-FM (103.3 FM) is a non-commercial radio station licensed to Cleveland, Ohio, known as "Moody Radio Cleveland". Owned by the Moody Bible Institute, the station broadcasts a religious format and is the Cleveland affiliate for Moody Radio. Both the WCRF-FM studios and transmitter are located in the Cleveland suburb of Brecksville.

In addition to a standard analog transmission, WCRF-FM is available online, and extends its coverage outside of the Greater Cleveland area by using five full-power satellites.

History
WCRF-FM signed on the air on November 23, 1958. Since its founding, it has been owned by the Moody Bible Institute. WCRF was the first Moody radio station outside the ministry's home base of Chicago. In 1981, the "-FM" suffix was re-added to the call sign after having been removed in 1960. WCRF-FM celebrated its 50th anniversary in 2008.

In 1998, WCRF won the National Association of Broadcasters Marconi Award for "Religious/Gospel Station of the Year."

Programming
The station features a locally-produced morning show hosted by Brian Dahlen and Jannelle Nevels. Daily Christian talk and teaching programs account for all other programming.

WCRF is a member of both the National Religious Broadcasters (NRB) and the Evangelical Council for Financial Accountability (ECFA).

Satellites and translators 
WCRF also extends its signal via the following full-power satellites:

References

External links

Repeaters

1958 establishments in Ohio
CRF
Moody Radio
Radio stations established in 1958
CRF